Several ships of the Argentine Navy ( Armada de la República Argentina) have been named La Argentina, with or without the prefix "ARA".

 , a frigate commanded by Hippolyte Bouchard in the corsair campaign 1817-1819
 , a schooner
 , a corvette 
 , a barque
 , a school ship in service from 1884 to 1900.
 , a light cruiser launched in 1937. She was decommissioned in 1972 and scrapped in 1974.

La Argentina, ARA